Crasnogorca (Krasnohirka, Krasnogorka) is a village in the Grigoriopol sub-district of Transnistria, Moldova. It is currently under the administration of the breakaway government of the Transnistrian Moldovan Republic. Prior to World War II it was in and on the western border of Ukraine, directly across the Dniester River from Romania.

References

Villages of Transnistria